Nyridela is a genus of moths in the family Erebidae.

Species
 Nyridela chalciope Hübner, 1827
 Nyridela xanthocera Walker, 1856

References

Natural History Museum Lepidoptera generic names catalog

Euchromiina
Moth genera